John H. Bishop (September 1877 – 8 July 1959) was a British cyclist. He competed in the 100 km event at the 1908 Summer Olympics.

References

External links
 

1877 births
1959 deaths
British male cyclists
Olympic cyclists of Great Britain
Cyclists at the 1908 Summer Olympics
Place of birth missing